Diplolophium is a genus of flowering plants belonging to the family Apiaceae.

Its native range is Tropical Africa.

Species:

Diplolophium africanum 
Diplolophium boranense 
Diplolophium buchananii 
Diplolophium diplolophioides 
Diplolophium somaliense 
Diplolophium swynnertonii 
Diplolophium zambesianum

References

Apioideae